The 2015–16 Stanford Cardinal women's basketball team will represent Stanford University during the 2015–16 NCAA Division I women's basketball season. The Cardinal, led by thirtieth year head coach Tara VanDerveer, played their home games at the Maples Pavilion and were a members of the Pac-12 Conference. They finished the season 27–8, 14–4 in Pac-12 play to finish in a tie for third place. They lost in the quarterfinals of Pac-12 women's tournament to Washington. They received an at-large bid to the NCAA women's tournament where they defeated San Francisco and South Dakota State in the first and second rounds, Notre Dame in the sweet sixteen before losing to Pac-12 member Washington in the elite eight.

Roster

Schedule

|-
!colspan=9 style="background:#8C1515; color:white;"| Exhibition

|-
!colspan=9 style="background:#8C1515; color:white;"| Non-conference regular season

|-
!colspan=9 style="background:#8C1515; color:white;"| Pac-12 regular season

|-
!colspan=9 style="background:#8C1515;"| Pac-12 Women's Tournament

|-
!colspan=9 style="background:#8C1515;"| NCAA Women's Tournament

Rankings

See also
2015–16 Stanford Cardinal men's basketball team

References

Stanford Cardinal women's basketball seasons
Stanford
Stanford